Kitt Wakeley is an American Grammy Award-winning composer, songwriter, musician, and music producer.  His album, Symphony of Sinners & Saints (featuring Joe Satriani) peaked at #1 on Billboard's Classical Crossover and Classical charts and at #18 on Hot Hard Rock Songs. Singles, Conflicted, Forgive Me, and Sinners and Saints, all peaked at #1 on Billboard's Hard Rock Digital Song Sales as well as charting in the Top-10 Hot Hard Rock Songs chart. He has released four studio albums that feature Nuno Bettencourt, Nita Strauss, Kenny Aronoff, Andy Timmons, the London Philharmonic Orchestra, the Royal Philharmonic Orchestra, and the London Voices, among others.

In 2023, Wakeley's An Adoption Story, won a Grammy Award for Best Classical Compendium.

Early life and education
Wakeley was born in Memphis, Tennessee and grew up in Holdenville, Oklahoma. He completed his bachelor's degree in Pre-Law and Sociology and a Masters in Public Administration from East Central University in Ada, Oklahoma where he was in the Gamma Xi Chapter of Phi Kappa Tau in 1987.

Music career
Wakeley is a composer, songwriter, musician, and music producer whose genres have been classified as rock, hard rock, EDM, and orchestral.  His professional career began at 16 years old when he was hired to write the intro for one of Oklahoma's top radio DJ's shows. He wrote, produced, and recorded songs for the rock band, Mydion. They released one album, Ashes and the Angel.

His first rock and EDM solo album, Cinematic Chaos, was released in 2013 under his pseudo-name, AudioKaoz.

His third orchestral rock collection, Midnight in Macedonia (recorded in Skopje, Macedonia), featured the Macedonian Choir and Macedonian Philharmonic Orchestra, was released in 2015.

Wakeley released his fourth solo studio album, Symphony of Sinners and Saints, recorded at the Abbey Road Studios in London, with the Royal Philharmonic and London Voices.  The album tour included shows at Carnegie Hall, the Civic Center Music Hall in Oklahoma, and SXSW (South by Southwest).

The first three singles from, Symphony of Sinners & Saints, hit number #1 on Billboard's, Rock Charts, with the album itself hitting #1 on Billboard's Crossover Classical and Classical charts.

Throughout his career, Wakeley has received numerous awards for his music. In 2019, at the Indie Music Awards he won awards in 8 categories including, Best New Male Artist of the Year, Best Special Live Performance, Best Instrumental Producer, Artist of The Year, and Best Instrumental Songwriter, and others.  He won, Song of the Year, at the Hollywood Music in Media Awards and two JMA (Josie Awards) in 2020 for, Songwriter of the Year, and Producer of the Year.  In 2021 he was inducted into the, Indie Music Hall of Fame, along with winning, Album of The Year for Symphony of Sinners and Saints.

In 2023, Wakeley's album, An Adoption Story, won a Grammy Award for Best Classical Compendium.  The album was recorded at Abbey Road Studios and features Joe Satriani, the London Symphony Orchestra and Wouter Kellerman.

Selected discography
Mydion – Ashes and the Angel
AudioKaoz – Cinematic Chaos
Midnight in Macedonia
Symphony of Sinners and Saints
Adoption Story

Billboard charts

Awards
{|class="wikitable sortable"
!Year
!Nominated Work
!Category
!Award
!Result
|-
| 2022 || An Adoption Story || Best Classical Compendium|| Grammy Award||  
|-
| 2022 ||Live and Recorded Sound || Outstanding Musical Ensemble|| Josie Music Awards||  
|-
| 2021 || You Gave Me Wings || Best Instrumental Song 
|| Hollywood Music in Media Awards||  
|-
| 2021 || Symphony of Sinners & Saints|| Album of the Year|| Josie Music Awards||  
|-
| 2021 ||  || Indie Music Hall of Fame Inductee|| Indie Music Hall of Fame|| 
|-
| 2021 || Forgive Me || Instrumental Song of the Year|| Hollywood Music in Media Awards||  
|-
| 2021 ||  || Outstanding Stage Production|| Josie Music Awards || 
|-
| 2020 ||  || Musician of the Year|| Josie Music Awards|| 
|-
| 2020 || You Gave Me Wings || Best Instrumental || Hollywood Music in Media Awards||  
|-
| 2019 || End of my Journey || Best Gospel Song|| Hollywood Music in Media Awards|| 
|-
| 2019 || Midnight in Macedonia || Album of the Year || ISSA (Independent Singer-Songwriter Awards)|| 
|-
| 2019 || Closure|| Best Instrumental Producer|| Indie Music Channel Awards || 
|-
| 2018 || Closure|| Best Instrumental Producer ||Indie Music Channel Awards|| 
|-
| 2019 || An Evening in Gotham || Best Instrumental Songwriter || Indie Music Channel Awards || 
|-
| 2019 || Closure || Best Male Instrumental Artist ||Indie Music Channel Awards||

Personal life
Wakeley is married to Melissa Wakeley. They share four biological children together and adopted three children.

References

External links

Living people
1979 births
Musicians from Memphis, Tennessee